Nancibella quintalia is a species of air-breathing land snail or semislug, a terrestrial pulmonate gastropod mollusks in the family Helicarionidae.

This species is endemic to Norfolk Island. It was thought to be extinct as of the mid-1990s, and the latest IUCN assessment, which is outdated, still lists it as Extinct. However, in 2020, a living specimen of the snail was discovered in the wild, leading scientists to believe a small population still exists.

References

Nancibella
Gastropods described in 1870
Taxonomy articles created by Polbot
Taxa named by James Charles Cox